Theodore Charles Rzempoluch (born May 31, 1941) is a former American football defensive back in the National Football League for the Washington Redskins.  He played in the NFL for only one season.  He played college football at the University of Virginia.

Rzempoluch played high school football at Cliffside Park High School, in Cliffside Park, New Jersey.

References

1941 births
Living people
Cliffside Park High School alumni
Players of American football from Jersey City, New Jersey
Sportspeople from Bergen County, New Jersey
American football defensive backs
Virginia Cavaliers football players
Washington Redskins players